Giampaolo Ambrosi (born 28 July 1940 in Pergine Valsugana) was an Italian luger who competed during the early 1960s. He won the gold medal in the men's doubles event at the 1962 FIL World Luge Championships in Krynica, Poland.

Ambrosi also finished tied for fifth in the men's doubles event at the 1964 Winter Olympics in Innsbruck.

References
 Hickok sports information on World champions in luge and skeleton.
 Wallenchinsky, David. (1984). "Luge: Men's Two-seater". In The Complete Book the Olympics: 1896–1980. New York: Penguin Books. p. 576.
 
 

1940 births
Italian male lugers
Lugers at the 1964 Winter Olympics
Living people
Olympic lugers of Italy
Sportspeople from Trentino